The 1971 Indiana Hoosiers football team represented the Indiana Hoosiers in the 1971 Big Ten Conference football season. The Hoosiers played their home games at Seventeenth Street Stadium in Bloomington, Indiana. The team was coached by John Pont, in his seventh year as head coach of the Hoosiers.

Schedule

1972 NFL draftees

First one-point safety
The first known occurrence of a one-point safety (conversion safety) was in an NCAA game on October 2, 1971, scored by Syracuse in the first quarter of a game at Indiana. On a point-after-touchdown kick, the ball was kicked almost straight up in the air. An Indiana player illegally batted the ball in the end zone (a spot foul defensive penalty). Syracuse won the game, 7–0. The 1970 rulebook (Rule 8-5-3) stated, "If a scrimmage kick fails to cross the neutral zone, or crosses the neutral zone and is first touched by Team B, or is untouched and then rebounds into the end zone where it is recovered by Team A, it is a safety," and (8-5-4) "If the penalty for a foul committed when the ball is free leaves the ball behind a goal line, it is a safety if behind the offender's goal line."

References

Indiana
Indiana Hoosiers football seasons
Indiana Hoosiers football